Laid is an Australian television comedy series that first aired on 9 February 2011 on ABC1. The 12-episode comedy series was written by Marieke Hardy and Kirsty Fisher, and produced by Liz Watts. Laid was renewed for a second series, which aired from 2 May to 6 June 2012.

Overview
Roo McVie is a market researcher who faces an unenviable situation when her former lovers start dying in strange and unexpected circumstances. With EJ, her best friend and flatmate, Roo embarks on a quest to find a pattern and stop the trail of deaths.

Cast

Regular
Alison Bell as Roo McVie
Celia Pacquola as EJ Griggs
Toby Truslove as Zach
Abe Forsythe as Charlie
Graeme Blundell as Graham McVie
Damon Herriman as Marcus Dwyer (series 2)

Recurring
Tracy Mann as Marion McVie
Huw McKinnon as Brendan
Celia Ireland as Brendan's Mum
Peter Callan as Brendan's Dad
Ryan Johnson as Davey
Septimus Caton as Andrew
Shaun Micallef as G-Bomb
Craig Anderson as Russ
Marcus Graham as Telly
Judi Farr as Nan
Deborah Kennedy as Jan Beane

Adaptation
In October 2011, it was reported that television network NBC bought the rights to adapt an American version of the series.

Home media
The first series of Laid was released on DVD under the title of Laid: The Complete First Season on 7 April 2011. The second series was released on DVD under the title of Laid: The Complete Second Season on 5 July 2012.

Accolades

Episodes

Series 1

Series 2

References

External links

Laid on ABC iview

Australian comedy television series
2011 Australian television series debuts
2012 Australian television series endings
Australian Broadcasting Corporation original programming
English-language television shows